Elkland may refer to:

 Elkland (band), a short-lived American band
 Elkland, Missouri
 Elkland, Pennsylvania
 Elkland Township (disambiguation) (multiple locations)